Sky Cable Corporation, doing business as Sky, is a Filipino telecommunications company based in Diliman, Quezon City. A subsidiary of the media conglomerate ABS-CBN, the company offers broadband, cable and satellite television services under the Sky Cable and Sky Direct brands. The company was founded on June 6, 1990 by Benpres Holdings Corporation (now Lopez Holdings Corporation) as Central CATV, Inc.

, the company had 1.4 million customers across the country, 200,000 of which are broadband internet subscribers.

History
On June 6, 1990, Sky Cable Corporation was incorporated as Central CATV, Inc. On March 25, 1991, Sky Vision Corporation, a holding company incorporated with the primary purpose of buying and owning stocks of Central CATV, Inc. was founded.

On March 30, 1995, Central CATV Inc. was granted a 25-year provisional franchise to establish, construct, maintain and operate community antenna television system in the Philippines through Republic Act 7969.

In 1997, Sky Vision Corporation acquired 47% of Pilipino Cable Corporation for 900 million pesos. In 2001, Sky Cable and Philippine Long Distance Telephone Company's Home Cable entered into a master consolidation agreement to form the holding company Beyond Cable, Inc. In April 2008, then ABS-CBN Broadcasting Corporation (now ABS-CBN Corporation), started consolidating the cable company’s fiscal result into its financial statement.

In May 2011, Singapore-based firm Sampaquita Communications Pte., Ltd. acquired 40 percent of Sky Cable through Philippine Depositary Receipts (PDR) worth 3.612 billion and 250 million pesos of convertible notes to fund the expansion of Sky Cable’s broadband internet and cable television services.

On May 11, 2012, Sky Cable acquired the assets of Destiny Cable (from Destiny Cable Inc.), UniCable (from Uni-Cable TV, Inc.) and MyDestiny broadband internet (from Solid Broadband Corporation) with consolidating value of 3.497 billion pesos.

In 2013, Sky Cable revenues increased by 18% to P6.99 billion from P5.94 billion. The growth in Sky Cable revenues was partly attributable to the acquisition of Destiny Cable, Inc. Postpaid revenues grew by 16% and broadband revenues by 33%. SKY’s cable TV subscriber count improved by 10 percent as of the end of 2012 while SKYbroadband registered a 44 percent growth on its base versus the previous year. In 2013, Sky discontinued its voice over IP service and started offering bundled plans with ABS-CBN Mobile postpaid service which includes a wireless landline connection, SMS, and voice.

On December 23, 2015, the NTC granted Sky an 18-month provisional license to begin offering direct-to-home satellite, with an initial investment of 252 million pesos to roll-out direct broadcast satellite service across 251 cities and municipalities in the Philippines.

In October 2019, Dito Telecommunity signed an agreement with Sky. Under the deal, Dito will utilize Sky's unused fiber-optic cables in Metro Manila.

On June 30, 2020, the National Telecommunications Commission issued a cease and desist order against Sky's direct-broadcast satellite service, Sky Direct.

Proposed investment by Cignal Cable Corporation
On August 10, 2022, it was announced that Cignal Cable Corporation, a subsidiary of MediaQuest Holdings, will acquire a 38.88% minority stake of Sky Cable Corporation through the execution of a "debt instruments agreement", with an option to acquire an additional 61.12% of Sky Cable shares within the next eight years. After ABS-CBN and TV5 had a partnership deal, the House of Representatives has set a briefing and SAGIP Representative Rodante Marcoleta commented that TV5 violated the broadcasting franchise with ABS-CBN deal. But a day later, the briefing scheduled was cancelled that supposed to happen on that day. On August 24, the two broadcasting companies agreed to pause their closing preparations for the deal following concerns from politicians and some government agencies. On September 1, 2022, both parties announced the termination of the proposed investment.

Sale agreement to PLDT Inc. 
On March 16, 2023, PLDT announced that it had entered into a sale and purchase agreement to acquire 100% of Sky Cable Corporation from Sky Vision Corporation, ABS-CBN Corporation and Lopez Inc. for  billion. The acquisition will cover Sky's broadband business and related assets, subject to compliance with certain conditions including the termination or cessation Sky's pay TV and cable businesses. The deal is subject to regulatory approvals. While awaiting the required regulatory approvals, Sky's broadband and cable TV services will continue.

Products and services

Sky Cable

Sky Cable is the flagship brand of Sky which operates cable television. It has around 500,000 subscribers in Metro Manila, suburbs and key cities in the provinces which include Metro Cebu and Metro Davao.

Destiny Cable

Destiny Cable (formerly Global Destiny Cable) is the only other cable television brand of Sky. It has around 200,000 subscribers in Metro Manila and Metro Cebu. Its brand along with its assets was acquired by Sky from Destiny Cable, Inc. in 2012. The assets of Uni-Cable was also consolidated in this brand after the acquisition of the asset from Uni-Cable TV, Inc. Destiny is also migrating its subscribers from analog to digital.

Sky Fiber
Sky Fiber (formerly Sky Broadband) is the broadband internet service brand of Sky launched in early 2011. The assets of MyDestiny broadband internet was consolidated in this brand after the acquisition from Solid Broadband Corporation. It has over 170,000 subscribers and is currently the fastest growing segment of the company. In 2012, Sky Broadband became the first internet service provider in the country to offer residential ultra high-speed internet with a download speed of up to 200 Mbit/s in select residential areas in Metro Manila. In 2019, SKY Broadband replaced as SKY Fiber.

Sky Direct

Sky Direct is the satellite television brand of Sky. It offers direct-broadcast satellite television in the country. It boasts a nationwide coverage and exclusive HD and SD channels not available on other providers. As of March 2019, Sky Direct has over 1 million subscribers. It stopped operations on June 30, 2020, due to the expiration of its franchise (and that of ABS-CBN's) on May 4, 2020.

Sky Biz
Sky Biz is the enterprise service provider brand of Sky. It offers integrated services such as dedicated ultra high-speed broadband internet to small and medium scale businesses in the country. At present, Sky Biz has over 3,000 enterprise subscribers.

Sky On Demand

Sky On Demand is the over-the-top content brand of Sky. It offers TV everywhere service to Sky Broadband and Sky Mobi subscribers. It allows users to watch video on demand contents of Sky Cable on any screen and devices.

Subsidiaries

Here is a list of assets owned by Sky Cable Corporation. Note that these are also recognized as an indirect subsidiary of the parent (ABS-CBN Corporation). All are wholly owned and operated unless otherwise indicated.

Bisaya Cable Television Network, Inc., through Telemondial Holdings, Inc.
Bright Moon Cable Networks, Inc.
Cavite Cable Corporation
Cebu Cable Television, Inc., 30% direct and 70% through Pacific CATV, Inc.
Cepsil Consultancy and Management Corporation
Davao Cableworld Network, Inc., through Pilipino Cable Corporation
Discovery Cable, Inc. (70%)
First Ilocandia CATV, Inc., 91.25% through Pilipino Cable Corporation
HM Cable Networks, Inc.
HM CATV, Inc.
Home-Lipa Cable, Inc. (60%)
Hotel Interactive Systems, Inc.
Isla Cable TV, Inc.
JMY Advantage Corporation (95%)
Mactan CATV Network, Inc., through Pacific CATV, Inc.
Medianow Strategies, Inc. (79.7%) 
Moonsat Cable Television, Inc., 55% direct and 45% through Telemondial Holdings, Inc.
Pacific CATV, Inc. (91.52%) through Pilipino Cable Corporation
Pilipino Cable Corporation, 54.5% direct and 45.5% through Telemondial Holdings, Inc.
Satellite Cable TV, Inc.
Suburban Cable Network, Inc. (92.5%)
Sunvision Cable, Inc.
Sun Cable Holdings, Inc.
Sun Cable Systems, Inc., through Sun Cable Holdings, Inc.
Tarlac Television Network, Inc.
Telemondial Holdings, Inc.

References

External links

Beta Version
Sky Cable on ABS-CBN Investor Relation
Sky Cable Corporation on BusinessWeek
Sky Cable Corporation on JobStreet.com
Sky Cable Review on whitehatseorankings.com

 
Assets owned by ABS-CBN Corporation
Cable television companies of the Philippines
Internet service providers of the Philippines
Companies based in Quezon City
Mass media companies established in 1990
1990 establishments in the Philippines
Telecommunications companies established in 2008